In topology and related branches of mathematics, Tychonoff spaces and completely regular spaces are kinds of topological spaces.  These conditions are examples of separation axioms. A Tychonoff space refers to any completely regular space that is also a Hausdorff space; there exist completely regular spaces that are not Tychonoff (i.e. not Hausdorff).

Tychonoff spaces are named after Andrey Nikolayevich Tychonoff, whose Russian name (Тихонов) is variously rendered as "Tychonov", "Tikhonov", "Tihonov", "Tichonov", etc. who introduced them in 1930 in order to avoid the pathological situation of Hausdorff spaces whose only continuous real-valued functions are constant maps.

Definitions

A topological space  is called  if points can be separated from closed sets via (bounded) continuous real-valued functions.

Remark. Completely regular spaces and Tychonoff spaces are related through the notion of Kolmogorov equivalence. A topological space is Tychonoff if and only if it's both completely regular and T0. On the other hand, a space is completely regular if and only if its Kolmogorov quotient is Tychonoff.

Naming conventions

Across mathematical literature different conventions are applied when it comes to the term "completely regular" and the "T"-Axioms. The definitions in this section are in typical modern usage. Some authors, however, switch the meanings of the two kinds of terms, or use all terms interchangeably. In Wikipedia, the terms "completely regular" and "Tychonoff" are used freely and the "T"-notation is generally avoided. In standard literature, caution is thus advised, to find out which definitions the author is using. For more on this issue, see History of the separation axioms.

Examples and counterexamples

Almost every topological space studied in mathematical analysis is Tychonoff, or at least completely regular.
For example, the real line is Tychonoff under the standard Euclidean topology.
Other examples include:

 Every metric space is Tychonoff; every pseudometric space is completely regular.
 Every locally compact regular space is completely regular, and therefore every locally compact Hausdorff space is Tychonoff.
 In particular, every topological manifold is Tychonoff.
 Every totally ordered set with the order topology is Tychonoff.
 Every topological group is completely regular.
 Generalizing both the metric spaces and the topological groups, every uniform space is completely regular. The converse is also true: every completely regular space is uniformisable.
 Every CW complex is Tychonoff.
 Every normal regular space is completely regular, and every normal Hausdorff space is Tychonoff.
 The Niemytzki plane is an example of a Tychonoff space that is not normal.

Properties

Preservation

Complete regularity and the Tychonoff property are well-behaved with respect to initial topologies. Specifically, complete regularity is preserved by taking arbitrary initial topologies and the Tychonoff property is preserved by taking point-separating initial topologies. It follows that:
 Every subspace of a completely regular or Tychonoff space has the same property.
 A nonempty product space is completely regular (respectively Tychonoff) if and only if each factor space is completely regular (respectively Tychonoff).

Like all separation axioms, complete regularity is not preserved by taking final topologies. In particular, quotients of completely regular spaces need not be regular. Quotients of Tychonoff spaces need not even be Hausdorff, with one elementary counterexample being the bug-eyed line. There are closed quotients of the Moore plane that provide counterexamples.

Real-valued continuous functions

 A space  is completely regular if and only if the cozero sets of  form a basis for the topology of 

Thus the category of completely regular spaces CReg is a reflective subcategory of Top, the category of topological spaces. By taking Kolmogorov quotients, one sees that the subcategory of Tychonoff spaces is also reflective.

The category of realcompact Tychonoff spaces is anti-equivalent to the category of the rings  (where  is realcompact) together with ring homomorphisms as maps. For example one can reconstruct  from  when  is (real) compact. The algebraic theory of these rings is therefore subject of intensive studies.
A vast generalization of this class of rings that still resembles many properties of Tychonoff spaces, but is also applicable in real algebraic geometry, is the class of real closed rings.

Embeddings

Tychonoff spaces are precisely those spaces that can be embedded in compact Hausdorff spaces. More precisely, for every Tychonoff space  there exists a compact Hausdorff space  such that  is homeomorphic to a subspace of 

In fact, one can always choose  to be a Tychonoff cube (i.e. a possibly infinite product of unit intervals). Every Tychonoff cube is compact Hausdorff as a consequence of Tychonoff's theorem. Since every subspace of a compact Hausdorff space is Tychonoff one has:

A topological space is Tychonoff if and only if it can be embedded in a Tychonoff cube.

Compactifications

In the same 1930 article where Tychonoff defined completely regular spaces, he also proved that every Tychonoff space has a Hausdorff compactification.

Among those Hausdorff compactifications, there is a unique "most general" one, the Stone–Čech compactification 

Uniform structures

Complete regularity is exactly the condition necessary for the existence of uniform structures on a topological space. In other words, every uniform space has a completely regular topology and every completely regular space  is uniformizable. A topological space admits a separated uniform structure if and only if it is Tychonoff.

Given a completely regular space  there is usually more than one uniformity on  that is compatible with the topology of  However, there will always be a finest compatible uniformity, called the fine uniformity on  If  is Tychonoff, then the uniform structure can be chosen so that  becomes the completion of the uniform space

See also

Citations

Bibliography

 
  
 

Separation axioms
Topological spaces
Topology